János Avar (13 June 1938 – 2 December 2021) was a Hungarian journalist. Avar was born in 1938. He died on 2 December 2021, at the age of 83.

References

1938 births
2021 deaths
People from Rožňava
Hungarian journalists
Hungarians in Slovakia